Lex Redelé (28 January 1939 – 18 April 2013) was a Dutch rower. He competed in the men's single sculls event at the 1960 Summer Olympics.

References

1939 births
2013 deaths
Dutch male rowers
Olympic rowers of the Netherlands
Rowers at the 1960 Summer Olympics
Sportspeople from Dordrecht